Scopula cassioides  is a moth of the family Geometridae. It was described by Prout in 1932. It is endemic to Kenya.

References

Endemic moths of Kenya
Endemic fauna of Kenya
Moths described in 1932
Moths of Africa
cassioides
Taxa named by Louis Beethoven Prout